Gooey was an Internet chat application launched in 1999. The system allowed people who were browsing the same web site at the same time to communicate with each other in a separate window. It was developed by Israeli software company Hypernix, which in 2000 was acquired by SIGA.

References

Online chat
Discontinued software